Letras & Poesía (Spanish for “Letters & Poetry”) is a nonprofit literary collaborative project aiming at the Spanish-speaking world. With over 60 authors from 13 countries, it deals with three different areas: 
a digital platform with short stories, poems and opinion articles,
poetry slams,
on-site literary gatherings. 
The project also features an online shop with anthologies and other books written by its authors.

Some authors of Letras & Poesía are juries in relevant literary contests.

References

External links 
 Website

Literature websites
Spanish-language websites
Poetry slams
Literary collaborations
2016 establishments in Colombia